Lohavanana is a commune located in the Atsinanana region of eastern Madagascar.  It belongs to the Marolambo District.

Religion
 FJKM - Fiangonan'i Jesoa Kristy eto Madagasikara (Church of Jesus Christ in Madagascar)

References

Populated places in Atsinanana